Eazzy is the professional name of Mildred Ashong (born August 1, 1986), a Ghanaian singer, rapper, and songwriter.

Early life
Mildred Ashong attended St Anthony's Junior and JSS school, Mfantsiman Secondary, Institute of languages, University of Professional Studies, and Chartered Institute of Marketing UK. She graduated in Birmingham,England with a postgraduate in chartered marketing UK at the Symphony Hall in November 2008.

Career
After a year in the music industry, she released her debut album Twinkle in August 2010. It was supported by the three singles: "Bo Wonsem Ma Me", "Wengeze" and “One Gal". The songs earned her two nominations at the 2010 4Syte Music Video Awards, as well as five nominations at the 2011 Ghana Music Awards.

Her collaboration with Richie on the song "One Gal" earned her the award for Best Story Line Video of the Year at the 2011 4Syte Music Video Awards.

In 2012, Eazzy and Lynx Entertainment annulled their business contract and mutually parted ways. She signed with UK Africori Distribution in 2014.

Her second album Against All Odds was released on iTunes in 2014. It features the hit singles "Go Go Wind", "Scream" and "Bad to da Bone", the latter of which features vocals from Edem. She hosted the Ghana Music Awards in 2014 and 2015. She was an official judge for The Next Big Thing, a hip hop talent series. Moreover, she was a judge on seasons 4, 5 and 7 and 8 of MTN Hitmaker.

She has released "Kpakposhito", "Nana" featuring Stonebwoy, "Forever" featuring Mr Eazi, "Power" featuring Shatta Wale, as well as the solo Hiplife/Afrobeats single "Obaa Gbemi".

Discography
Wengeze
Twinkle (2010)
One Gal
Bo Wonsem Ma Me
Against All Odds (2014)
’’ Solo Ep (2019)

Awards
 Best Story Line Video of the Year 2011 – 4Syte Music Video Awards
 Best Female Video of the Year 2016 – 4Syte Music Video Awards
 Best Fashion Icon Ghana Kids Choice Awards

References

1986 births
Living people
Ghanaian rappers
21st-century Ghanaian women singers
21st-century Ghanaian singers
Ghanaian women rappers
Mfantsiman Girls' Secondary School alumni